Via, formerly Via Varejo, is a Brazilian retail company founded in 2010 through the merger of retail companies Casas Bahia, owned by the Klein family, and Ponto, owned by Grupo Pão de Açúcar. Since June 2019, the Klein family own a controlling stake in Via Varejo.

History

In December 2009, Grupo Pão de Açúcar purchased Casas Bahia and transferred its retail units to Globex Utilidades SA, Ponto Frio's parent company which was purchased by the group in June earlier that year.

The company operates retail online through its subsidiary Nova Pontocom, an e-commerce company that was born in 2010 by the merger of the online operations of Casas Bahia, Ponto Frio, and Extra, a hypermarket chain owned by Grupo Pão de Açúcar. Nova Pontocom holds 18% of the market share in Brazilian online retail.

In early 2012, Globex Utilidades officially changed its corporate name to Via Varejo.

In May 2013, it was announced that the Klein family is planning to sell as much as R$ 2 billion (16%) worth of their stake in the company through an IPO. 53.7 million common shares of the family's stake began trading on December 16, 2013. Via Varejo raised R$ 2.845 billion through a public offering of shares. Three quarters of the amount raised went to the Klein family, while the rest went to GPA. Ownership of the company has changed to GPA with 43.3%, the Klein family with 27.3%, and minority shareholders with 29.3%.

In October 2013, it was announced that Via Varejo will acquire the remaining 75% stake of Móveis Bartira, an exclusive provider of furniture for Casas Bahia and Ponto Frio, founded by Samuel Klein in 1962.

In June 2014, Cnova Brazil, a global e-commerce company with a total gross merchandise volume of $4.9 billion, was created through a joint venture between Casino, GPA, Via Varejo and Exito. Cnova Brazil will be directly owned 46.5% by Casino (including its subsidiary Exito) and 53.5% indirectly by GPA, Via Varejo and certain founding shareholders of Nova Pontocom.

In June 2019, it was announced that the Klein family became the largest shareholder of Via Varejo with a 27% stake, after GPA sold its entire stake.

Operations

Via Varejo holds a 21.9% stake in Cnova Brazil, which owns and operates the following online stores: Extra.com.br, Casasbahia.com.br, Pontofrio.com.

As of July 2020, the company has 1073 stores in Brazil, distributed under the brands Casas Bahia with 857 stores and Ponto Frio with 216 stores. The state with the largest number of Casas Bahia and Ponto Frio stores is São Paulo, with 358 and 59 stores respectively.

References

External links
Via Varejo - official website (English)
Via Varejo on Bloomberg
Via Varejo on Reuters

Retail companies of Brazil
Retail companies established in 2010
Companies based in São Paulo (state)
Department stores of Brazil
Companies listed on B3 (stock exchange)
Brazilian brands
GPA (company)